Adam Wayne Miller (born November 26, 1984) is an American former professional baseball pitcher.

Career
Miller graduated from McKinney High School in 2003 and was selected by the Cleveland Indians as a sandwich pick (31st overall) in the 2003 Major League Baseball Draft. Miller only managed 15 starts combined between Mahoning Valley and Kinston.

He started the 2008 season as a starting pitcher with the Triple-A Buffalo Bisons after being placed on the 40-man roster for the Cleveland Indians in November .

When healthy, Miller throws a mid-90s mph four-seam fastball, a high-80s mph slider, a sinker and a changeup.

In 2009, Miller had reconstructive surgery on the middle finger of his throwing hand. As of December 2009, Miller had four surgeries to various parts of his right arm. Miller has returned to AA Akron with the Indians organization, where reports have him hitting 94-96 MPH on the radar gun. The Indians declined to offer him a major league contract by the December 2009 non-tendering deadline, but signed him to a minor league contract December 13.

On January 4, 2012, Miller signed a minor league contract with the New York Yankees, receiving an invitation to spring training.

Miller played with the Sugar Land Skeeters of the Atlantic League of Professional Baseball in 2013. He signed a minor league contract with the Cleveland Indians to return to Minor League Baseball on March 18, 2014.

On December 18, 2014, the Pittsburgh Pirates signed Miller.

References

External links

Stats from minorleabuebaseball.com

1984 births
Living people
Sportspeople from Plano, Texas
Kinston Indians players
Baseball players from Texas
Burlington Indians players (1986–2006)
Lake County Captains players
Akron Aeros players
Buffalo Bisons (minor league) players
Mahoning Valley Scrappers players
Águilas Cibaeñas players
American expatriate baseball players in the Dominican Republic
Scranton/Wilkes-Barre Yankees players
Trenton Thunder players
Grand Prairie AirHogs players
Sugar Land Skeeters players
Akron RubberDucks players
Columbus Clippers players
Baseball pitchers
Indianapolis Indians players
Mesa Solar Sox players
Surprise Rafters players
Gulf Coast Pirates players
Altoona Curve players
Minor league baseball players